Ocelus is a Celtic god known from three inscriptions in Roman Britain. He is twice invoked on dedications at Caerwent: one stone is the base of a statue of which only a pair of human feet and a pair of goose feet survive. The invocation is to Mars Lenus or Ocelus Vellaunus and the "numen" (spirit) of the emperor, and was dedicated on 23 August AD 152. The second Caerwent inscription dedicates an altar to Mars Ocelus. The god was also venerated at Carlisle, where he was once more equated with Mars and again linked to the imperial cult. So Ocelus seems to have been a British, perhaps Silurian god, associated with Mars, probably in the latter's Celtic capacity as a protector. At Caerwent he is linked with Lenus, a Treveran healing deity, and with Vellaunus, who is recorded among the Gaulish Allobroges.

The Caerwent inscription uses the actual name of Ocelus and reads as follows:

DEO MARTI OCELO
AEL AGUSTINUS
OP V S L M

God Mars Ocelus
Ael(ius) Agustinus
Op(tio) Paid His Vow

(VSLM stood for Votum Soluit Libens Merito)

References 
 Green, Miranda. Dictionary of Celtic Myth and Legend. Thames and Hudson Ltd. London. 1997

External links 
 Roman Altar found in Caerwent

Gods of the ancient Britons
Martian deities